There have been nine baronetcies created for persons with the surname Anderson, four in the Baronetage of England, one in the Baronetage of Great Britain and four in the Baronetage of the United Kingdom. All creations are extinct.

The Anderson Baronetcy, of St Ives in the County of Huntingdon, was created in the Baronetage of England on 3 January 1629 for John Anderson. The title became extinct on his death in 1630.

The Anderson Baronetcy, of Penley in the County of Hertford, was created in the Baronetage of England on 3 July 1643 for Henry Anderson. The title became extinct on the death of the second Baronet in 1699.

The Anderson Baronetcy, of Broughton in the County of Lincoln, was created in the Baronetage of England on 11 December 1660 for Edmund Anderson. The title became extinct on the death of the ninth Baronet in 1891.

The Anderson Baronetcy, of Eyworth in the County of Bedford, was created in the Baronetage of England on 13 July 1664 for Stephen Anderson. The title became extinct on the death of the third Baronet in 1773.

The Anderson Baronetcy, of Mill Hill, Hendon, in the County of Middlesex, was created in the Baronetage of Great Britain on 14 May 1798 for John Anderson, Lord Mayor of London from 1797 to 1798. The title became extinct on his death in 1813.

The Anderson Baronetcy, of Fermoy in the County of Cork, was created in the Baronetage of the United Kingdom on 22 March 1813 for the 20-year-old James Anderson, in recognition of the public services rendered to Ireland by his father, the businessman John Anderson. Sir James later gained recognition in his own right as an inventor. The title became extinct on his death in 1861.

The Anderson Baronetcy, of Parkmount in the County of the City of Belfast and of Mullaghmore in the County of Monaghan, was created in the Baronetage of the United Kingdom on 22 June 1911 for Robert Anderson, Lord Mayor of Belfast from 1908 to 1910. The title became extinct on his death in 1921.

The Anderson Baronetcy, of Ardtaraig in the County of Perth, was created in the Baronetage of the United Kingdom on 7 May 1919 for the Scottish businessman and public servant Kenneth Anderson. The title became extinct on his death in 1942.

The Anderson Baronetcy, of Harrold Priory in the County of Bedford, was created in the Baronetage of the United Kingdom on 15 June 1920 for the Scottish businessman, writer and lecturer John Anderson. The title became extinct on his death in 1963.

Anderson baronets, of St Ives (1629)
Sir John Anderson, 1st Baronet (died 1630)

Anderson baronets, of Penley (1643)
Sir Henry Anderson, 1st Baronet (–1653)
Sir Richard Anderson, 2nd Baronet (c. 1635–1699)

Anderson baronets, of Broughton (1660)
Sir Edmund Anderson, 1st Baronet (1605–1661)
Sir John Anderson, 2nd Baronet (1628–1670)
Sir Edmund Anderson, 3rd Baronet (c. 1661–1676)
Sir Edmund Anderson, 4th Baronet (1629–c. 1703)
Sir Edmund Anderson, 5th Baronet (1687–1765) 
Sir William Anderson, 6th Baronet (1722–1785)  
Sir Edmund Anderson, 7th Baronet (1758–1799)  
Sir Charles John Anderson, 8th Baronet (1767–1846)  
Sir Charles Henry John Anderson, 9th Baronet (1804–1891)

Anderson baronets, of Eyworth (1664)
Sir Stephen Anderson, 1st Baronet (c. 1644–1707)  
Sir Stephen Anderson, 2nd Baronet (1678–1741) 
Sir Stephen Anderson, 3rd Baronet (1708–1773)

Anderson baronets, of Mill Hill (1798)
Sir John William Anderson, 1st Baronet (c. 1736–1813)

Anderson baronets, of Fermoy (1813)
Sir James Caleb Anderson, 1st Baronet (1792–1861)

Anderson baronets, of Parkmount and Mullaghmore (1911)
Sir Robert Anderson, 1st Baronet (1837–1921)

Anderson baronets, of Ardtaraig (1919)

Sir Kenneth Skelton Anderson, 1st Baronet (1866–1942)

Anderson baronets, of Harrold Priory (1920)

 Sir John Anderson, 1st Baronet (1878–1963)

See also
 Anderson (surname)
 Lord Anderson (disambiguation)
 Earl of Yarborough, peerage created in the United Kingdom (Anderson-Pelham family)

References

External links
Sir Kenneth Skelton Anderson of the Yair, Galashiels

Bibliography

Extinct baronetcies in the Baronetage of England
Extinct baronetcies in the Baronetage of Great Britain
Extinct baronetcies in the Baronetage of the United Kingdom
1629 establishments in England